Dead in the Water is a novel by Nancy Holder, published by Abyss/Dell in 1994.

Plot summary
Dead in the Water is a horror novel which involves several characters (a cancer-ridden boy and his doctor father, a bickering wealthy couple, an old lady whose husband was lost at sea, and a female cop who once failed to save the life of a drowning boy) aboard a rickety old freighter.

Reception
Cliff Ramshaw reviewed Dead in the Water for Arcane magazine, rating it a 6 out of 10 overall. Ramshaw comments that "Jarring, and not particularly evocative. Things start slowly, not least because the only character drawn with any conviction is the lady cop - one significant item of person history is about as much as the other characters get. Gradually, though, the plot and the fog thicken, and a brooding sense of nastiness evolves as our heroes desperately ignore the increasingly strange going on around them."

Reviews
Review by Scott Winnett (1994) in Locus, #403 August 1994 
Review by Graham Andrews (1996) in Vector 187
Kliatt

References

1994 novels
Bram Stoker Award for Novel winners